Boron monoxide (B2O) is a chemical compound of boron and oxygen. Two experimental studies have proposed existence of diamond-like and graphite-like B2O, as for boron nitride and carbon solids. However, a later, systematic, experimental study of boron oxide phase diagram suggests that B2O is unstable. The instability of the graphite-like B2O phase was also predicted theoretically.

See also 
 Boron suboxide
 Boron trioxide
 Boron
 Aluminium(I) oxide

References

Boron compounds
Oxides